Cottage in the Pines, also known as Pine Park Cottage and Dunwald Farm, is a national historic district located at  Rio in Orange County, New York.  The district includes: a large three-story boarding house (c. 1895); a mill and weir (c. 1900); a large woodshop; mill pond; two smaller workshops; a machine shop (c. 1936); bungalow; and several small sheds.  The boarding house is a three-story, L-shaped frame building.  It features a full width front porch and fishscale shingles.  The property reflects the once popular recreational boarding house culture.

It was listed on the National Register of Historic Places in 2015.

References

Historic districts on the National Register of Historic Places in New York (state)
Hotel buildings on the National Register of Historic Places in New York (state)
Buildings and structures completed in 1895
Buildings and structures in Orange County, New York
National Register of Historic Places in Orange County, New York